Michael John Randal MacKellar  (27 October 1938 – 9 May 2015) was an Australian politician. He was a member of the Liberal Party and served in the House of Representatives from 1969 to 1994, representing the Division of Warringah. He was Minister for Immigration and Ethnic Affairs (1975–1979) and Minister for Health (1979–1982) in the Fraser Government.

Biography
MacKellar was born in Moree, New South Wales and educated at the Sydney Church of England Grammar School, before attending the University of Sydney and University of Oxford. He was an agricultural scientist, working at the New South Wales Department of Agriculture and lecturing at the University of Sydney and New South Wales before he entered politics. He was first elected to Parliament in 1969, taking over from the controversial Edward St. John. In June 1974 he joined the Shadow Cabinet as Shadow Immigration Minister.

Fraser Government (1975–1983)
In December 1975, MacKellar was first appointed to the front bench as the Minister for Immigration and Ethnic Affairs, a position he held until 1979, when he became Minister for Health and Minister Assisting the Prime Minister. In Opposition, MacKellar acted as Shadow Minister for Science.

MacKellar attracted some controversy over his handling of an incident involving the improper importation of a colour television set. In 1982, a ministerial staffer submitted an incorrect customs declaration form when arranging for the set to be imported. When this was discovered, a fellow Minister, John Moore, attempted a cover-up. Moore and MacKellar both accepted responsibility and resigned as ministers.

In Opposition (1983–1994)
Following the 1983 election defeat he returned to the frontbench as Shadow Foreign Affairs Minister, before being demoted to Shadow Science Minister after the 1984 election. After Andrew Peacock resigned he moved to the backbench.

He contested the Liberal Deputy leadership three times 1982, 1985 & 1987, finishing second to John Howard in 1982.

MacKellar resigned from Parliament on 18 February 1994, causing a by-election that was subsequently won by future Prime Minister Tony Abbott.

After Politics
After leaving politics MacKellar became Chairman of the Australia New Zealand Food Authority in 1998. He also acted as Chief Operations Officer of the Baker Medical Research Institute and Chief Executive Officer of the Plastics and Chemicals Industries Association. MacKellar also served as the president of the Melbourne-based National Ageing Research Institute.

Personal life
Mackellar had three children, one of whom was autistic. His daughter Maggie was the subject of an episode of ABC TV's Australian Story. He died on 9 May 2015 at the age of 76. He was given a state funeral on 15 May 2015 at St John's Anglican Church, Toorak, Victoria.

References

External links
Parlinfo Web Biography from the Parliament of Australia
Chronology of Events relating to the Membership of the 37th Parliament
Australian Electoral Commission: Warringah (NSW) By-election (26 March 1994)
Ministerial Resignations and Dismissals Since 1901
Papers on Parliament No. 28 – November 1996 – Poets, Presidents, People and Parliament Republicanism and other issues – Chapter 6 – The Minister and His Private Office
ABC electoral profile for Warringah
ANZFA Annual Report, 1999–2000 (PDF)
https://web.archive.org/web/20091030015032/http://www.nari.unimelb.edu.au/
https://web.archive.org/web/20110217130929/http://www.nari.unimelb.edu.au/governance/board_members.htm

1938 births
2015 deaths
Members of the Australian House of Representatives for Warringah
Members of the Australian House of Representatives
Liberal Party of Australia members of the Parliament of Australia
Australian agriculturalists
Australian people of Scottish descent
Politicians from Sydney
Members of the Order of Australia
Chief operating officers
20th-century Australian politicians
Australian Ministers for Health